Polypodiidae may refer to:
Polypodiidae (cnidarians), a zoological family that only includes Polypodium hydriforme, a cnidarian parasite of fish eggs
Polypodiidae (plant),  a botanical subclass of Equisetopsida sensu lato that includes the leptosporangiate ferns
 Polypodiidae  a botanical subclass that only includes the fern family Osmundaceae